Jonathan Nelson (born May 6, 1988) is a former American football safety for the Carolina Panthers of the National Football League (NFL). He was drafted by the St. Louis Rams in the seventh round of the 2011 NFL Draft. He played college football at the University of Oklahoma.

Early years
Nelson attended Summit High School in Arlington, Texas. He was a three-year starter at cornerback. According to his coaches opponents threw away from his side of the field and as a result he ended the season with only one interception. The previous season he made 40 tackles and recovered four fumbles and recorded one interception. Nelson was a sprinter on the track team.

College career

In his first year at Oklahoma, he redshirted the 2006 season. As a redshirt freshman in 2007, Nelson played in just two games due to injury. As a sophomore, he played on special teams, making seven tackles on the season. Nelson began the 2009 season as a nickel back, but started the final three games of the season and recorded 46 tackles and three interceptions. He was chosen honorable mention All-Big 12. After spending his career as a backup, Nelson broke out as a senior, making 102 tackles, breaking up seven passes and intercepting two more. He was rewarded by being selected All-Big 12 Honorable Mention for the second consecutive season.

Professional career

2011 NFL Draft

St. Louis Rams
Nelson was drafted with the 229th pick in the 2011 NFL Draft by the St. Louis Rams. He was waived during final roster cuts on September 3, 2011, but was re-signed to the team's practice squad on September 4. He was released from the practice squad on September 13.

Carolina Panthers
Nelson was signed to the Panthers' practice squad on November 16, 2011. He was promoted to the active roster by the Carolina Panthers on December 23, 2011. He appeared in the final two games of the regular season, recording nine tackles and one interception in the games combined. In week 16 of the 2011 season against the Tampa Bay Buccaneers he was named the NFC Defensive Rookie of the Week after recording seven tackles and one interception.

References

External links
 Oklahoma Sooners bio

1988 births
Living people
Players of American football from Texas
Oklahoma Sooners football players
American football safeties
St. Louis Rams players
Carolina Panthers players